Neophrida is a genus of snout moths. It was described by Heinrich Benno Möschler in 1882.

Species
 Neophrida aurolimbalis Möschler, (1881) 1882
 Neophrida meterythralis Hampson, 1916
 Neophrida porphyrea Whalley, 1964

References

Tirathabini
Pyralidae genera
Taxa named by Heinrich Benno Möschler